Report is an independent investigative journalistic TV program in Italy, aired on Rai 3, a channel of the Italian national network RAI for the first time in 1997. The first season were transmitted late in the night, but its increasing success made it possible to move it to prime time.

It was inspired by a similar program, Professione Reporter (Profession: Reporter), aired from 1994 to 1996.

Each episode is structured to touch a different topic: corporate crime, political corruption, criminal schemes, nutrition, health, science, economy, society or environment.

The author and anchorwoman was, since the beginnig, the freelance journalist Milena Gabanelli. The other journalists and episode editors are: Giovanna Boursier, Michele Buono, Giovanna Corsetti, Giorgio Fornoni, Sabrina Giannini, Bernardo Iovene, Paolo Mondani, Piero Riccardi e Stefania Rimini. Sigfrido Ranucci co-authored the show for ten years and in March 2017 he became Milena Gabanelli's successor. Chiara Baldassari was also part of the Report team until her death in 2005. Paolo Barnard, author of some of the most critical episodes about globalisation, Israel and economical organisations, decided to leave Report after internal disputes.

In 2016 the program won the Television Direction Award for Best Program of the Year. In 2021 the Flaiano awards for television, radio and journalism, for the Best TV Program.

Episode list

1997-1998
First Season
 TROPPO BELLO PER ESSERE VERO (Science)
 MOBILITA' (Transports)
 GLI EFFETTI DELL' ELETTROSMOG (Environment)
 L'AFFARE AIDS (Health)
 TV E AUDITEL (Society)

1998-1999
Second Season

 ENTI INUTILI, aired  10/12/98 (society - useless and costly organisations)
 LO STATO CHIESA, aired  10/12/98 (society - Italian church)
 BENEFICENZA aired 3/12/1998 (society - charity issues)
 ACQUA PAGATA ACQUA REGALATA aired 12/11/1998 (society - water)
 IDEE, INVENZIONI, BREVETTI aired 5/11/1998 (society - patents)
 LA FOLLIA, aired 29/10/1998 (society - folly)
 IL VIRUS DELL'OBBLIGO, aired 15/10/1998 (health - vaccinations)
 NON SOLO IL DENTE E' AVVELENATO, aired 08/10/1998 (health - dentistry)
 CARISSIMA SALMA, aired 01/10/1998 (society - business on the dead) 
 IL GENE SFIGURATO, aired 24/09/1998 (society - genetics and agriculture)

2008-2009
Season 12

 L'INTESA (Economy) - survey on Alitalia case
 IL PRIMARIO (Health)
 GLI SCOPPIATI (Economy)
 IL SINDACALISTA (Society)
 L'EREDITA' (Environment) - about nuclear energy and pollution in Italy
 MARE NOSTRUM (Environment)
 L’ORO DI ROMA (Environment) - about waste crisis on Rome\Italy
 IL PIATTO E' SERVITO (Health\Food)
 I VICERE’ (Society)
 MODULAZIONE DI FREQUENZE (Society)
 L'INGANNO (Environment)
 POVERI NOI! (Economy)
 COME TU M'INSEGNI (Society)
 LA CURA (Health)
 PORTE GIREVOLI (Health)
 IL RE E' NERO (Society)
 CARNE (Health\Food)
 COM'È ANDATA A FINIRE? (Society)
 IL MALE COMUNE (Society)
 LA RICADUTA (Environment) - about Niger oil and Italian oil company

Trials
Due to its work, the survey journalists working on Report have been subject to a lot of intimidating legal action.
Up until last season not one of these cases had been lost by Report. But during the 2009-2010 Italian television season Rai removed free legal assistance to their journalist.

References

External links
Report web site - episodes list
Report HomePage

Italian television news shows
Television news program articles using incorrect naming style